Submarine Boat Company (Submarine Boat Corporation) was a large-scale World War I ship manufacturing shipyard, located at Newark, New Jersey's Port of Newark. Submarine Boat Company operated as a subsidiary of the Electric Boat Company, now General Dynamics Electric Boat. Submarine Boat Company was founded in April 1915 to meet the demand for ships for World War I. Submarine Boat Corporation built the Design 1023 ships, this was a steel-hulled cargo ship. Submarine Boat Company built merchant cargo ships from 1917 to 1922. Submarine Boat Company was to able to complete ships quickly as they had other shipyards prefabricate about 80% of the hull. Submarine Boat Company worked with: Merchant Shipbuilding Corporation in Bristol, Pennsylvania, and American International Shipbuilding, in Hog Island, Philadelphia, Pennsylvania. During World War I, at its peak, the shipbuilding the company employed 25,000 people. The Submarine Boat Company received a 150 shipbuilding contract from the United States Shipping Board (USSB)'s Emergency Fleet Corporation, and 118 ships were completed before the contract was canceled. Submarine Boat Company built and sold the last 32 ships on their own for the Transmarine shipping line. After the war in 1920, Submarine Boat built 30 206-ton barges for Transmarine. With no more contracts, the shipyard closed in 1922 and the company went into receivership in 1929. For World War II the shipyard was reopened by Federal Shipbuilding and Drydock Company. The location of the former Submarine Boat Company shipyard is at the Toyota Logistics Services Inc. automobile terminal, 390 E. Port Street, Newark, just south of Interstate 78.

While Submarine Boat Company ended shipbuilding in 1922, due to its good working with steel, in 1923 it received a construction contract from the Newton Amusement Corporation to build a 1,000-seat stadium theater. Submarine Boat Company supplied 50 tons of steel columns. This was the last project before closing.

Background
The Submarine Boat Company did not build any submarines, its name was given from its parent company Electric Boat Company, which was started in 1899 by Isaac Rice. The Electric Boat Company build a submarine based on John Philip Holland designs. These were based on Lewis Nixon's designs at the Crescent Shipyard in Elizabeth, New Jersey.

Transmarine Corporation
Submarine Boat Company operated the Transmarine Corporation (Transco) or Transmarine Lines a shipping company from 1922 to 1930, with 32 ships and 29 barges they had built. Providing east coast, west coast, Texas, Cuba and South America with cargo shipping services. With the  barges working on the New York State Canal System with five tugboats. Barges moved cargo from New York City to Buffalo, New York in seven to nine days.

Atlantic Port Railway
The Submarine Boat Corporation incorporated, on May 4, 1920, the Atlantic Port Railway Corporation, to move cargo to and from Transmarine Lines. The company was a common carrier rail line, it owned no property right of ways. Atlantic Port Railway operated standard-gage steam railroad, at the Port Newark with rail lines that connected to the Central Railroad of New Jersey and the Pennsylvania Railroad Company to Transmarine docks.

Submarine Boat Company ships
(Note if the ship as two or more names listed, this means the ship was renamed while under construction)

Cargo ship 3,642 DWT
Submarine Boat Company built ship,s Cargo 1023 ships with	3,642 DWT:
	Agawam	 ,  	Hull #	1	 ,  	Ship ID #	216996	 ,  	Delivered:	December 18	 ,  	USSB #	547	 ,  	
	Alamosa	 ,  	Hull #	2	 ,  	Ship ID #	217244	 ,  	Delivered:	March-19	 ,  	USSB #	548	 ,  	
	Alcona	 ,  	Hull #	3	 ,  	Ship ID #	217243	 ,  	Delivered:	March-19	 ,  	USSB #	549	 ,  	
	Ingold	 ,  	Hull #	4	 ,  	Ship ID #	217242	 ,  	Delivered:	April-19	 ,  	USSB #	550	 ,  	
	Charlot	 ,  	Hull #	5	 ,  	Ship ID #	217253	 ,  	Delivered:	April-19	 ,  	USSB #	551	 ,  	
	Chetopa	 ,  	Hull #	6	 ,  	Ship ID #	217623	 ,  	Delivered:	August-19	 ,  	USSB #	552	 , 	renamed Ljubica Matkovic in 1938, torpedoed and sank in 1942 
	Cokata	 ,  	Hull #	7	 ,  	Ship ID #	217254	 ,  	Delivered:	March-19	 ,  	USSB #	553	 ,  	
	Minnicotta/Decatur Bridge	 ,  	Hull #	8	 ,  	Ship ID #	217485	 ,  	Delivered:	April-19	 ,  	USSB #	554	 ,  	
	Minooka/Fort Pitt Bridge	 ,  	Hull #	9	 ,  	Ship ID #	217595	 ,  	Delivered:	April-19	 ,  	USSB #	555	 ,  	
	Monana	 ,  	Hull #	10	 ,  	Ship ID #	217621	 ,  	Delivered:	August-19	 ,  	USSB #	556	 ,  	
	Phoenix Bridge	 ,  	Hull #	11	 ,  	Ship ID #	217241	 ,  	Delivered:	April-19	 ,  	USSB #	557	 ,  	
	Muscado/Chicago Bridge	 ,  	Hull #	12	 ,  	Ship ID #	217486	 ,  	Delivered:	April-19	 ,  	USSB #	558	 ,  	
	Chartiers/Mount Vernon Bridge 	 ,  	Hull #	13	 ,  	Ship ID #	217594	 ,  	Delivered:	April-19	 ,  	USSB #	559	 ,  	
	Panola	 ,  	Hull #	14	 ,  	Ship ID #	217251	 ,  	Delivered:	May-19	 ,  	USSB #	560	 ,  	
	Onekama	 ,  	Hull #	15	 ,  	Ship ID #	217493	 ,  	Delivered:	August-19	 ,  	USSB #	561	 ,  	
	Jekyl	 ,  	Hull #	16	 ,  	Ship ID #	217602	 ,  	Delivered:	May-19	 ,  	USSB #	562	 ,  	
	Ontonagon/Milwaukee Bridge	 ,  	Hull #	17	 ,  	Ship ID #	217928	 ,  	Delivered:	May-19	 , 	USSB #	563	 , 	Renamed SS Malama in 1927, bombed and sank in 1942, Two died and 33 crew with 5 Air Corps taken to POW Camp.
	Costavailla/Hico	 ,  	Hull #	18	 ,  	Ship ID #	217484	 ,  	Delivered:	April-19	 ,  	USSB #	564	 ,  	
	Opelika	 ,  	Hull #	19	 ,  	Ship ID #	217483	 ,  	Delivered:	May-19	 ,  	USSB #	565	 ,  	
	Opelousas/Masca	 ,  	Hull #	20	 ,  	Ship ID #	217924	 ,  	Delivered:	May-19	 ,  	USSB #	566	 ,  	
	Opequan	 ,  	Hull #	21	 ,  	Ship ID #	217925	 ,  	Delivered:	June-19	 ,  	USSB #	567	 ,  	
	Oquawka/Allies	 ,  	Hull #	22	 ,  	Ship ID #	217581	 ,  	Delivered:	May-19	 ,  	USSB #	568	 ,  	
	Oriskany/Consort	 ,  	Hull #	23	 ,  	Ship ID #	217622	 ,  	Delivered:	May-19	 ,  	USSB #	569	 ,  	
	Decosta/Wisconsin Bridge	 ,  	Hull #	24	 ,  	Ship ID #	217929	 ,  	Delivered:	June-19	 ,  	USSB #	570	 ,  	Renamed SS Wisconsin Bridge in 1921, wrecked in the Abacos in 1929
	Fortesque/Bethlehem Bridge	 ,  	Hull #	25	 ,  	Ship ID #	218237	 ,  	Delivered:	Jul-19	 ,  	USSB #	571	 ,  	
	Faraby	 ,  	Hull #	26	 ,  	Ship ID #	217640	 ,  	Delivered:	May-19	 ,  	USSB #	572	 ,  	
	Farnam	 ,  	Hull #	27	 ,  	Ship ID #	217568	 ,  	Delivered:	May-19	 ,  	USSB #	573	 ,  	
	Fenwick/Jackson	 ,  	Hull #	28	 ,  	Ship ID #	218246	 ,  	Delivered:	June-19	 ,  	USSB #	574	 ,  	
	Iberville/Louisville Bridge	 ,  	Hull #	29	 ,  	Ship ID #	217997	 ,  	Delivered:	June-19	 ,  	USSB #	575	 ,  	
	Acken/National Bridge	 ,  	Hull #	30	 ,  	Ship ID #	217927	 ,  	Delivered:	May-19	 ,  	USSB #	576	 ,  	
	Nesco	 ,  	Hull #	31	 ,  	Ship ID #	217601	 ,  	Delivered:	May-19	 ,  	USSB #	577	 ,  	
	Masca	 ,  	Hull #	32	 ,  	Ship ID #	217924	 ,  	Delivered:	May-19	 ,  	USSB #	578	 ,  	
	Moela/Knoxville	 ,  	Hull #	33	 ,  	Ship ID #	217927	 ,  	Delivered:	June-19	 ,  	USSB #	579	 ,  	
	Fragata/Anniston	 ,  	Hull #	34	 ,  	Ship ID #	217998	 ,  	Delivered:	June-19	 ,  	USSB #	580	 ,  	
	Fiaca/Chattanooga	 ,  	Hull #	35	 ,  	Ship ID #	217996	 ,  	Delivered:	June-19	 ,  	USSB #	581	 ,  	
	Orancken/Montgomery	 ,  	Hull #	36	 ,  	Ship ID #	218208	 ,  	Delivered:	June-19	 ,  	USSB #	582	 ,  	
	Elberon/St. Augustine	 ,  	Hull #	37	 ,  	Ship ID #	218242	 ,  	Delivered:	June-19	 ,  	USSB #	583	 ,  	
	Bound Brook	 ,  	Hull #	38	 ,  	Ship ID #	218059	 ,  	Delivered:	July-19	 ,  	USSB #	584	 ,  	renamed SS China Victor in 1947, sank in 1949
	Amboy/Glynn County/Brasher	 ,  	Hull #	39	 ,  	Ship ID #	218234	 ,  	Delivered:	July-19	 ,  	USSB #	585	 ,  	
	Aruba/Pinellas County/Johnson City	 ,  	Hull #	40	 ,  	Ship ID #	218239	 ,  	Delivered:	July-19	 ,  	USSB #	586	 ,  	
	Hamilton County/Shortsville	 ,  	Hull #	41	 ,  	Ship ID #	218241	 ,  	Delivered:	August-19	 ,  	USSB #	587	 ,  	
	Ocala/Jefferson County	 ,  	Hull #	42	 ,  	Ship ID #	218238	 ,  	Delivered:	July-19	 ,  	USSB #	588	 ,  	
	Allamuchy/Hillsborough County 	 ,  	Hull #	43	 ,  	Ship ID #	218240	 ,  	Delivered:	June-19	 ,  	USSB #	589	 ,  	
	Oyachita/Dade County	 ,  	Hull #	44	 ,  	Ship ID #	218236	 ,  	Delivered:	July-19	 ,  	USSB #	590	 ,  	
	Waacksock/St. Johns County	 ,  	Hull #	45	 ,  	Ship ID #	218235	 ,  	Delivered:	August-19	 ,  	USSB #	591	 ,  	
	Watop/Davidson County	 ,  	Hull #	46	 ,  	Ship ID #	218456	 ,  	Delivered:	August-19	 ,  	USSB #	592	 ,  	
	Wallkill/Unicoi County	 ,  	Hull #	47	 ,  	Ship ID #	218460	 ,  	Delivered:	August-19	 ,  	USSB #	593	 ,  	
	Woodmansie/Mantee County	 ,  	Hull #	48	 ,  	Ship ID #	218461	 ,  	Delivered:	September-19	 ,  	USSB #	594	 ,  	
	Wawayanda/Boston Bridge		Hull #	49		Ship ID #	218453		Delivered:	July-19		USSB #	595		
	Bay Head	 ,  	Hull #	50	 ,  	Ship ID #	218454	 ,  	Delivered:	July-19	 ,  	USSB #	596	 ,  	
	Morris/Pontia	 ,  	Hull #	51	 ,  	Ship ID #	218459	 ,  	Delivered:	Aug-19	 ,  	USSB #	785	 ,  	
	Aquahatan/Hopedale/Assinippi	 ,  	Hull #	52	 ,  	Ship ID #	218458	 ,  	Delivered:	August-19	 ,  	USSB #	786	 ,  	
	Brookline/Delavan	 ,  	Hull #	53	 ,  	Ship ID #	218633	 ,  	Delivered:	Sep-19	 ,  	USSB #	787	 ,  	
	Springfield/Calno	 ,  	Hull #	54	 ,  	Ship ID #	218455	 ,  	Delivered:	August-19	 ,  	USSB #	788	 ,  	
	Delcambie/Pawtucket	 ,  	Hull #	55	 ,  	Ship ID #	218457	 ,  	Delivered:	August-19	 ,  	USSB #	789	 ,  	
	Haddon	 ,  	Hull #	56	 ,  	Ship ID #	218631	 ,  	Delivered:	September-19	 ,  	USSB #	790	 ,  	
	Aquedocton/Cambridge	 ,  	Hull #	57	 ,  	Ship ID #	218634	 ,  	Delivered:	August-19	 ,  	USSB #	791	 ,  	
	Bird City/Asquam	 ,  	Hull #	58	 ,  	Ship ID #	218691	 ,  	Delivered:	August-19	 ,  	USSB #	792	 ,

Cargo ship 3,545 DWT

Submarine Boat Company built ship,s Cargo 1023 ships with	3,545 DWT:
	City of Fairbury/Ablanset	 ,  	Hull #	59	 ,  	Ship ID #	218786	 ,  	Delivered:	September-19	 ,  	USSB #	793	 ,  	
	Acockus/Casper/Lackawanna Valley	 ,  	Hull #	60	 ,  	Ship ID #	218789	 ,  	Delivered:	September-19	 ,  	USSB #	794	 ,  	
	Waco	 ,  	Hull #	61	 ,  	Ship ID #	218632	 ,  	Delivered:	September-19	 ,  	USSB #	795	 ,  	
	Acockus/Labette/Asabeth	 ,  	Hull #	62	 ,  	Ship ID #	218787	 ,  	Delivered:	September-19	 ,  	USSB #	796	 ,  	
	Ashuelot/Minnequa/Lordship Manor	 ,  	Hull #	63	 ,  	Ship ID #	218793	 ,  	Delivered:	September-19	 ,  	USSB #	797	 ,  	
	Aspomsok/Tulsa/Parksville	 ,  	Hull #	64	 ,  	Ship ID #	218822	 ,  	Delivered:	September-19	 ,  	USSB #	798	 ,  	
	Sevo/Fourth Alabama	 ,  	Hull #	65	 ,  	Ship ID #	218788	 ,  	Delivered:	September-19	 ,  	USSB #	799	 ,  	
	Assinippi/Mabel Hunter/Nonantum	 ,  	Hull #	66	 ,  	Ship ID #	218794	 ,  	Delivered:	September-19	 ,  	USSB #	800	 ,  	
	Attitash/Corson/Buffalo Bridge	 ,  	Hull #	67	 ,  	Ship ID #	218821	 ,  	Delivered:	October-19	 ,  	USSB #	801	 , taken by Japan, renamed SS Kosei Maru in 1938, torpedoed and sank in 1943 
	Ancoot/Wheatland/Putnam	 ,  	Hull #	68	 ,  	Ship ID #	218795	 ,  	Delivered:	September-19	 ,  	USSB #	802	 ,  	
	Autopscot/Nobles/Clark Mills	 ,  	Hull #	70	 ,  	Ship ID #	218946	 ,  	Delivered:	October-19	 ,  	USSB #	804	 ,  	
	Anaquascut/Deer Lodge/Federal Bridge	 ,  	Hull #	71	 ,  	Ship ID #	218944	 ,  	Delivered:	October-19	 ,  	USSB #	805	 ,  	
	Absolona/Tripp/Marsodak	 ,  	Hull #	72	 ,  	Ship ID #	218943	 ,  	Delivered:	October-19	 ,  	USSB #	806	 , 	renamed SS Balladier in 1942, torpedoed and sank in 1942 
	Apautuck/Dewey/Independent Bridge 	 ,  	Hull #	73	 ,  	Ship ID #	219047	 ,  	Delivered:	October-19	 ,  	USSB #	807	 ,  	
	Jalmar/Kootenai	 ,  	Hull #	74	 ,  	Ship ID #	219050	 ,  	Delivered:	November-19	 ,  	USSB #	808	 ,  	
	Jabish/Deuel/Indiana Bridge/Coquitt	 ,  	Hull #	75	 ,  	Ship ID #	219242	 ,  	Delivered:	October-19	 ,  	USSB #	809	 ,  	
	Chequocket/Cook	 ,  	Hull #	76	 ,  	Ship ID #	219045	 ,  	Delivered:	December-19	 ,  	USSB #	810	 ,  	
	Chockolog/Hamlin	 ,  	Hull #	77	 ,  	Ship ID #	219076	 ,  	Delivered:	November-19	 ,  	USSB #	811	 ,  	
	Coasuck/Tampa/Moosehausic	 ,  	Hull #	78	 ,  	Ship ID #	219049	 ,  	Delivered:	October-19	 ,  	USSB #	812	 ,  	
	Cohanit/Watertown/Kenwood Bridge	 ,  	Hull #	79	 ,  	Ship ID #	219051	 ,  	Delivered:	November-19	 ,  	USSB #	813	 ,  	renamed SS Leonita in 1920, foundered in 1921 
	Ilion/Lackawanna Bridge	 ,  	Hull #	80	 ,  	Ship ID #	219048	 ,  	Delivered:	Oct-19	 ,  	USSB #	814	 ,  	
	Coquitt/Indiana Bridge	 ,  	Hull #	81	 ,  	Ship ID #	219242	 ,  	Delivered:	December-19	 ,  	USSB #	815	 ,  	
	Coskata/Hartford/Coskata	 ,  	Hull #	82	 ,  	Ship ID #	219239	 ,  	Delivered:	December-19	 ,  	USSB #	816	 ,  	
	Kahna/Lakeside Bridge	 ,  	Hull #	83	 ,  	Ship ID #	219243	 ,  	Delivered:	December-19	 ,  	USSB #	817	 ,  wrecked on the Azores Pico Island in 1920, in a gale after loss of propeller
	Cushnet/Waterbury/Cushnet	 ,  	Hull #	84	 ,  	Ship ID #	219240	 ,  	Delivered:	December-19	 ,  	USSB #	818	 ,  	
	Cuttyhunk/Auditor/Cuttyhunk	 ,  	Hull #	85	 ,  	Ship ID #	219241	 ,  	Delivered:	December-19	 ,  	USSB #	819	 ,  	
	Mascuppie/Glen Ridge/Massillon Bridge	 ,  	Hull #	86	 ,  	Ship ID #	219245	 ,  	Delivered:	December-19	 ,  	USSB #	820	 ,  	
	Malysee/Kerhonkson/Northwestern Bridge 	 ,  	Hull #	87	 ,  	Ship ID #	219246	 ,  	Delivered:	December-19	 ,  	USSB #	821	 ,  	
	Massick/Rockaway Park/Margus	 ,  	Hull #	88	 ,  	Ship ID #	219244	 ,  	Delivered:	January-20	 ,  	USSB #	822	 ,  	
	Margus/Palisades/Massick	 ,  	Hull #	89	 ,  	Ship ID #	219263	 ,  	Delivered:	December-19	 ,  	USSB #	823	 ,  	
	Meeshawn / Tenafly / Mopang	 ,  	Hull #	90	 ,  	Ship ID #	219280	 ,  	Delivered:	January-20	 ,  	USSB #	824	 , SS Mopang sank by a mine in 1921 near the port of Burgas 
	Brasher/Riverside Bridge/Minnewawa	 ,  	Hull #	91	 ,  	Ship ID #	219264	 ,  	Delivered:	January-20	 ,  	USSB #	825	 ,  	
	Menemsha / Rock Island Bridge,  	Hull #	92	 ,  	Ship ID #	219337	 ,  	Delivered:	January-20	 ,  	USSB #	826	 , had collision when the Irish tanker SS Iroquois rammed her three times in fog, Rock Island Bridge on March 23, 1920, was wrecked and then scrapped.
	Monodac/Toledo Bridge	 ,  	Hull #	93	 ,  	Ship ID #	219499	 ,  	Delivered:	January-20	 ,  	USSB #	827	 ,  	
	Monomac	 ,  	Hull #	94	 ,  	Ship ID #	219336	 ,  	Delivered:	January-20	 ,  	USSB #	828	 ,  	
	Monponset/Vincennes Bridge	 ,  	Hull #	95	 ,  	Ship ID #	219503	 ,  	Delivered:	February-20	 ,  	USSB #	829	 ,  	
	Manasack/Virginia Bridge	 ,  	Hull #	96	 ,  	Ship ID #	219586	 ,  	Delivered:	April-20	 ,  	USSB #	830	 ,  	
	Pittsburgh Bridge/Tekoa	 ,  	Hull #	97	 ,  	Ship ID #	219766	 ,  	Delivered:	March-20	 ,  	USSB #	831	 ,  	
	Moolinoo/Archbold Bridge/Tashmoo	 ,  	Hull #	98	 ,  	Ship ID #	219497	 ,  	Delivered:	April-20	 ,  	USSB #	832	 ,  renamed SS Takusei Maru in 1938, torpedoed and sank in 1942 byb USS Greenling (SS-213)
	Minnehonk/East Chicago/Tonesit	 ,  	Hull #	99	 ,  	Ship ID #	219501	 ,  	Delivered:	March-20	 ,  	USSB #	833	 ,  	
	Mavosheen/Noddle Island Bridge/Tona	 ,  	Hull #	100	 ,  	Ship ID #	219500	 ,  	Delivered:	February-20	 ,  	USSB #	834	 ,  	
	Menamah/Noddle Island Bridge/Haslehurst	 ,  	Hull #	101	 ,  	Ship ID #	219495	 ,  	Delivered:	March-20	 ,  	USSB #	835	 ,  	
	Crailhope/Rising Sun/Tulaid	 ,  	Hull #	102	 ,  	Ship ID #	219502	 ,  	Delivered:	February-20	 ,  	USSB #	836	 ,  	
	Minnewawa/Riverside Bridge	 ,  	Hull #	103	 ,  	Ship ID #	219585	 ,  	Delivered:	April-20	 ,  	USSB #	837	 ,  	renamed SS Coast Farmer in 1937, torpedoed and sank in 1942
	Missanco/Moravia Bridge	 ,  	Hull #	104	 ,  	Ship ID #	219519	 ,  	Delivered:	April-20	 ,  	USSB #	838	 ,  	Later Mana 1926, scrapped 1947
	Manhanset/Des Moines Bridge 	 ,  	Hull #	105	 ,  	Ship ID #	219587	 ,  	Delivered:	April-20	 ,  	USSB #	839	 ,  	
	Yapam/Plow City	 ,  	Hull #	106	 ,  	Ship ID #	219584	 ,  	Delivered:	April-20	 ,  	USSB #	840	 ,  	
	Yukpa/Sterling Steel Bridge/Suwied	 ,  	Hull #	107	 , 	Ship ID #	219496	 , 	Delivered:	February-20	 , 	USSB #	841	 ,  Torpedoed and sank in 1942 off Cozumel Island off the Yucatán Peninsula.
	Yashi/Holyoke Bridge	 ,  	Hull #	108	 ,  	Ship ID #	219588	 ,  	Delivered:	May-20	 ,  	USSB #	842	 , renamed  in 1937, torpedoed and sank in 1942
	Yoati/Anthracite Bridge 	 ,  	Hull #	109	 ,  	Ship ID #	219760	 ,  	Delivered:	May-20	 ,  	USSB #	843	 ,  	
	Yokowish/Fort Armstrong	 ,  	Hull #	110	 ,  	Ship ID #	219759	 ,  	Delivered:	May-20	 ,  	USSB #	844	 ,  	renamed SS Takuen Maru in 1938, foundered off Hokkaido in 1941
	Tona/Noddle Island	 ,  	Hull #	111	 ,  	Ship ID #	219765	 ,  	Delivered:	May-20	 ,  	USSB #	845	 ,  	
	Tolan/New England Iron/New England	 ,  	Hull #	112	 ,  	Ship ID #	219583	 ,  	Delivered:	April-20	 ,  	USSB #	846	 ,  	
	Tonesit/East Chicago	 ,  	Hull #	113	 ,  	Ship ID #	219758	 ,  	Delivered:	April-20	 ,  	USSB #	847	 ,  	
	Tockwotten/Schuykill Bridge	 ,  	Hull #	114	 ,  	Ship ID #	219757	 ,  	Delivered:	May-20	 ,  	USSB #	848	 ,  	
	Tuladi/Rising Sun/Oronoke	 ,  	Hull #	115	 ,  	Ship ID #	219860	 ,  	Delivered:	June-20	 ,  	USSB #	849	 ,  	
	Tacconnet/Wheeling Mold	 ,  	Hull #	116	 ,  	Ship ID #	219861	 ,  	Delivered:	June-20	 ,  	USSB #	850	 ,  	
	Tashmoo/Archbold Bridge/Pittsburgh Bridge	 ,  	Hull #	117	 ,  	Ship ID #	219766	 ,  	Delivered:	May-20	 ,  	USSB #	851	 ,  	renamed SS Mapele in 1936, wrecked in 1943 off Shumagin Islands Alaska.
	Tashua/Everett Bridge/Neshobee	 ,  	Hull #	118	 ,  	Ship ID #	219859	 ,  	Delivered:	June-20	 ,  	USSB #	852	 ,  	
	Tauchaud, Suwied, Sterling Steel Bridge/Italia	 ,  	Hull #	119	 ,  	Ship ID #	219876	 ,  	Delivered:	June-20	 ,  	USSB #	853	 ,  	
	Telos/Irving Bridge/Suboatco	 ,  	Hull #	120	 ,  	Ship ID #	220010	 ,  	Delivered:	June-20	 ,  	USSB #	854	 ,  	
	Temisconata/Kellogg Bridge/Suedco	 ,  	Hull #	121	 ,  	Ship ID #	220011	 ,  	Delivered:	June-20	 ,  	USSB #	855	 ,  	
	Tekoa/Suportco	 ,  	Hull #	122	 ,  	Ship ID #	220248	 ,  	Delivered:	June-20	 ,  	USSB #	856	 ,  	
	Teapanock/Elchankoe/Sunelseco	 ,  	Hull #	123	 ,  	Ship ID #	220012	 ,  	Delivered:	July-20	 ,  	USSB #	857	 ,  	
	Tobique/Sudurco	 ,  	Hull #	124	 ,  	Ship ID #	220609	 ,  	Delivered:	August-20	 ,  	USSB #	858	 ,  	
	Tomahegan/Glenora/Sutransco	 ,  	Hull #	125	 ,  	Ship ID #	220246	 ,  	Delivered:	October-20	 ,  	USSB #	859	 ,  	
	Pemetic/Natirar/Sutermco	 ,  	Hull #	126	 ,  	Ship ID #	220531	 ,  	Delivered:	September-20	 ,  	USSB #	860	 ,  	renamed SS Admiral Day in 1931, wrecked off Canton Island in 1940, crew saved by HMAS Manoora (F48).
	Beargrove/Surailco	 ,  	Hull #	127	 ,  	Ship ID #	220403	 ,  	Delivered:	October-20	 ,  	USSB #	861	 ,  	
	Pico/Suelco	 ,  	Hull #	128	 ,  	Ship ID #	220247	 ,  	Delivered:	September-20	 ,  	USSB #	862	 ,  	
	Piston/Sunewco	 ,  	Hull #	129	 ,  	Ship ID #	220402	 ,  	Delivered:	October-20	 ,  	USSB #	863	 ,  	
	Powwow/Sutorpco	 ,  	Hull #	130	 ,  	Ship ID #	220401	 ,  	Delivered:	September-20	 ,  	USSB #	864	 ,  	
	Onota/Tustem/Suholco	 ,  	Hull #	131	 ,  	Ship ID #	220245	 ,  	Delivered:	August-20	 ,  	USSB #	865	 ,  	renamed SS Miranda in 1949, foundered in 1950
	Oronoke/Surico	 ,  	Hull #	132	 ,  	Ship ID #	220560	 ,  	Delivered:	September-20	 ,  	USSB #	866	 ,  	
	Hiawasse/Vierling Bridge/Suduffco	 ,  	Hull #	133	 ,  	Ship ID #	220559	 ,  	Delivered:	October-20	 ,  	USSB #	867	 ,  	Foundered in 1926
	Quonset/Sudawsonco	 ,  	Hull #	134	 ,  	Ship ID #	220626	 ,  	Delivered:	November-20	 ,  	USSB #	868	 ,  	
	Naddock/Sumanco	 ,  	Hull #	135	 ,  	Ship ID #	220532	 ,  	Delivered:	October-20	 ,  	USSB #	869	 ,  	
	Nugunket/Susherico	 ,  	Hull #	136	 ,  	Ship ID #	220561	 ,  	Delivered:	October-20	 ,  	USSB #	870	 ,  	Renamed Manini in 1928, torpedoed and sank in 1941 
	Nehumkee/Jelcaw/Surichco	 ,  	Hull #	137	 ,  	Ship ID #	220693	 ,  	Delivered:	November-20	 ,  	USSB #	871	 ,  	renamed SS Admiral Wiley in 1930, wrecked off New Guinea in 1940
	Nebelow/Sulanierco	 ,  	Hull #	138	 ,  	Ship ID #	220627	 ,  	Delivered:	November-20	 ,  	USSB #	872	 ,  	
	Nequosset/Suremico	 ,  	Hull #	139	 ,  	Ship ID #	220694	 ,  	Delivered:	November-20	 ,  	USSB #	873	 ,  	renamed SS Nisqually in 1928, bombed and sank in off Wake Island in 1941
	Neskett/Suscolanco	 ,  	Hull #	140	 ,  	Ship ID #	220635	 ,  	Delivered:	October-20	 ,  	USSB #	874	 ,  	
	Neshobee/Sujameco	 ,  	Hull #	141	 ,  	Ship ID #	220863	 ,  	Delivered:	November-20	 ,  	USSB #	875	 ,  	Wrecked off Coos Bay in 1929
	Quinney/Suwordenco	 ,  	Hull #	142	 ,  	Ship ID #	220862	 ,  	Delivered:	December-20	 ,  	USSB #	876	 ,  	Renamed SS Admiral Halstead, damaged in Japanese raid on Darwin on 1942-02-19
	Deacon/Suwarinco	 ,  	Hull #	143	 ,  	Ship ID #	220861	 ,  	Delivered:	December-20	 ,  	USSB #	877	 ,  	
	Ibena/Sunewarkco	 ,  	Hull #	144	 ,  	Ship ID #	220994	 ,  	Delivered:	January-21	 ,  	USSB #	878	 ,  	
	Desha/Tamara/Sunugentco	 ,  	Hull #	145	 ,  	Ship ID #	221024	 ,  	Delivered:	January-21	 ,  	USSB #	879	 ,  	renamed SS Sisunthon Nawa in 1940, scuttled off Surabaya in 1942 
	Kaboka/Sugillenco	 ,  	Hull #	146	 ,  	Ship ID #	220888	 ,  	Delivered:	March-21	 ,  	USSB #	880	 ,  	renamed SS Columbine in 1942, torpedoed and sank in 1944
	Dearing/Sujerseyco	 ,  	Hull #	147	 ,  	Ship ID #	220993	 ,  	Delivered:	February-21	 ,  	USSB #	881	 ,  	Later Makawao 1928, scrapped 1946
	Benoit/Suspearco	 ,  	Hull #	148	 ,  	Ship ID #	221066	 ,  	Delivered:	May-21	 ,  	USSB #	882	 ,  	
	Bigtunk/Sucubaco	 ,  	Hull #	149	 ,  	Ship ID #	221125	 ,  	Delivered:	June-21	 ,  	USSB #	883	 ,  	
	Bunganut/Suphenco	 ,  	Hull #	150	 ,  	Ship ID #	221212	 ,  	Delivered:	January-23	 ,  	USSB #	884	 ,

Transmarine barges

Submarine Boat Company built Transmarine Barge with 206 DWT, these were used for east coast coastal transport by Submarine Boat Company, subsidiary Transmarine: 
	Transmarine No. 100	 ,  	Hull #	151	 ,  	Ship ID #	167934	 ,  	Delivered:	1920
	Transmarine No. 101	 ,  	Hull #	152	 ,  	Ship ID #	167935	 ,  	Delivered:	1920
	Transmarine No. 102	 ,  	Hull #	153	 ,  	Ship ID #	167936	 ,  	Delivered:	1920
	Transmarine No. 103	 ,  	Hull #	154	 ,  	Ship ID #	167937	 ,  	Delivered:	1920
	Transmarine No. 104	 ,  	Hull #	155	 ,  	Ship ID #	167954	 ,  	Delivered:	1920
	Transmarine No. 105	 ,  	Hull #	156	 ,  	Ship ID #	167955	 ,  	Delivered:	1920
	Transmarine No. 106	 ,  	Hull #	157	 ,  	Ship ID #	167956	 ,  	Delivered:	1920
	Transmarine No. 107	 ,  	Hull #	158	 ,  	Ship ID #	167957	 ,  	Delivered:	1920
	Transmarine No. 108	 ,  	Hull #	159	 ,  	Ship ID #	168161	 ,  	Delivered:	1921
	Transmarine No. 109	 ,  	Hull #	160	 ,  	Ship ID #	168162	 ,  	Delivered:	1921
	Transmarine No. 110	 ,  	Hull #	161	 ,  	Ship ID #	168163	 ,  	Delivered:	1921
	Transmarine No. 111	 ,  	Hull #	162	 ,  	Ship ID #	168164	 ,  	Delivered:	1921
	Transmarine No. 112	 ,  	Hull #	163	 ,  	Ship ID #	168165	 ,  	Delivered:	1921
	Transmarine No. 113	 ,  	Hull #	164	 ,  	Ship ID #	168166	 ,  	Delivered:	1921
	Transmarine No. 114	 ,  	Hull #	165	 ,  	Ship ID #	168167	 ,  	Delivered:	1921
	Transmarine No. 115	 ,  	Hull #	166	 ,  	Ship ID #	168168	 ,  	Delivered:	1921
	Transmarine No. 116	 ,  	Hull #	167	 ,  	Ship ID #	168157	 ,  	Delivered:	1921
	Transmarine No. 117	 ,  	Hull #	168	 ,  	Ship ID #	168158	 ,  	Delivered:	1921
	Transmarine No. 118	 ,  	Hull #	169	 ,  	Ship ID #	168159	 ,  	Delivered:	1921
	Transmarine No. 119	 ,  	Hull #	170	 ,  	Ship ID #	168160	 ,  	Delivered:	1921
	Transmarine No. 120	 ,  	Hull #	171	 ,  	Ship ID #	168382	 ,  	Delivered:	1922
	Transmarine No. 121	 ,  	Hull #	172	 ,  	Ship ID #	168383	 ,  	Delivered:	1922
	Transmarine No. 122	 ,  	Hull #	173	 ,  	Ship ID #	168384	 ,  	Delivered:	1922
	Transmarine No. 123	 ,  	Hull #	174	 ,  	Ship ID #	168385	 ,  	Delivered:	1922
	Transmarine No. 124	 ,  	Hull #	175	 ,  	Ship ID #	168386	 ,  	Delivered:	1922
	Transmarine No. 125	 ,  	Hull #	176	 ,  	Ship ID #	168387	 ,  	Delivered:	1922
	Transmarine No. 126	 ,  	Hull #	177	 ,  	Ship ID #	168388	 ,  	Delivered:	1922
	Transmarine No. 127	 ,  	Hull #	178	 ,  	Ship ID #	168389	 ,  	Delivered:	1922
	Transmarine No. 128	 ,  	Hull #	179	 ,  	Ship ID #	168390	 ,  	Delivered:	1922
	Transmarine No. 129	 ,  	Hull #	180	 ,  	Ship ID #	168391	 ,  	Delivered:	1922

See also
Electro-Dynamic Company sister company to Submarine Boat Company 
Electric Launch Company sister company to Submarine Boat Company 
 New London Ship and Engine Company sister company to  Submarine Boat Company 
Delaware River Iron Ship Building and Engine Works
John Roach & Sons

References

Defunct shipbuilding companies of the United States
United States home front during World War I
Vehicle manufacturing companies established in 1915
Defunct manufacturing companies based in New Jersey
Manufacturing companies based in Newark, New Jersey